The Social Democratic and Labour Party (SDLP) is a social-democratic and Irish nationalist political party in Northern Ireland. The SDLP currently has eight members in the Northern Ireland Assembly (MLAs) and two Members of Parliament (MPs) in the House of Commons of the United Kingdom.

The SDLP party platform advocates Irish reunification and further devolution of powers while Northern Ireland remains part of the United Kingdom. During the Troubles, the SDLP was the most popular Irish nationalist party in Northern Ireland, but since the Provisional IRA ceasefire in 1994, it has lost ground to the republican party Sinn Féin, which in 2001 became the more popular of the two parties for the first time. Established during the Troubles, a significant difference between the two parties was the SDLP's rejection of violence, in contrast to Sinn Féin's then-support for (and organisational ties to) the Provisional IRA and physical force republicanism.

History

Foundation and early history

The party was founded in August 1970, when six Stormont MPs and one Senator, former members of the Republican Labour Party (a party with ties to the Irish Labour Party), the National Democratic Party (NDP, a small nationalist party that dissolved itself after the foundation of the SDLP), individual nationalists, former members of the Nationalist Party and members of the Northern Ireland Labour Party, joined to form a new party.

The SDLP initially rejected the Nationalist Party's policy of abstentionism and sought to fight for civil rights within the Stormont system. However, the SDLP quickly came to the view that Stormont was unreformable, and withdrew from parliamentary involvement.

After the abolition of the Parliament of Northern Ireland, the SDLP emerged as the second-largest party, and the largest party representing the nationalist community, in elections to the new Northern Ireland Assembly established in 1973: the party won 19 out of 75 seats.  The SDLP was one of the parties involved in the negotiations that resulted in the Sunningdale Agreement, which in turn resulted in the establishment of a power-sharing executive in January 1974.  Gerry Fitt, the SDLP party leader, took office as deputy chief executive, taking government alongside the Ulster Unionist Party (led by Brian Faulkner) and the Alliance Party.  The Assembly and Executive were short-lived, however, collapsing after only four months due to sustained opposition from within the unionist community regarding the role being given to the Irish government in terms of Northern Ireland: it was to be 25 years before the party sat in government again.

Good Friday Agreement and return to government
The SDLP was a key player in the talks throughout the 1990s that led to the signing of the Good Friday Agreement in 1998. John Hume won a Nobel Peace Prize that year with Ulster Unionist Party leader David Trimble in recognition of their efforts.

As a result of the Agreement, elections to a new Northern Ireland Assembly were held in June 1998; the SDLP emerged as the second-largest party overall, and the largest nationalist party, with 24 out of 108 seats. The party was then returned to government later in the year when a power-sharing Executive was established for Northern Ireland. The SDLP took office alongside the Ulster Unionist Party (UUP), the Democratic Unionist Party (DUP), and Sinn Féin, and the SDLP's Seamus Mallon became Deputy First Minister alongside the UUP's First Minister, David Trimble.

Upon Mallon's retirement in 2001, Mark Durkan succeeded him as Deputy First Minister.

All-island Merger
There had been a debate in the party on the prospects of amalgamation with Fianna Fáil. Little came of this speculation and former party leader, Margaret Ritchie, rejected the idea.  Speaking at the 2010 Irish Labour Party national conference in Galway she said that a merger would not happen while she was leader – "Merger with Fianna Fáil?  Not on my watch." After his election as Fianna Fáil Leader in January 2011, Micheál Martin repeatedly dismissed the possibility of a merger or electoral alliance with the SDLP.  In January 2019, the SDLP membership were e-mailed on the issue with the text "continuing on as normal is not an option", a reference to the party's declining fortunes.

In February 2019, at a special party conference, the members approved a partnership with Fianna Fáil, the main opposition party in the Republic of Ireland. Both parties shared policies on key areas including addressing the current political situation in Northern Ireland, improving public services in both jurisdictions of Ireland, such as healthcare and education, and bringing about further unity and co-operation of the people on the island and arrangements for a future poll on Irish reunification.

Claire Hanna, MLA for Belfast South and party spokesperson on Brexit, quit the assembly group as a result.

In the lead up to the 2022 Assembly election, party leader Colum Eastwood played down the partnership stating, "The SDLP stands on its own two feet." This led people to commentate that the partnership is no longer active, with comments from as early as 2020 determining that it had been "quietly forgotten". The partnership officially ended on 28 September 2022.

Westminster Parliament
In contrast to Sinn Féin, which follows a policy of abstentionism, the SDLP MPs have always taken their seat in the Westminster parliament. The party's first MP was its leader Gerry Fitt who was already a sitting MP when the SDLP was founded. The SDLP's best result was in 1992 general election when they won four out of 17 seats. Its worst result was in 2017 when they lost all their seats. In 2019 they won two seats.

Although not abstentionist, SDLP MPs have protested the parliamentary oath required of every member of parliament. At the swearing in ceremony after the 2019 general election, the party leader Colum Eastwood said:

"Under protest and in order to represent my constituency, I do solemnly, sincerely and truly declare and affirm that I will be faithful and bear true allegiance to Her Majesty Queen Elizabeth, her heirs and successors, according to law. My true allegiance is to the people of Derry and the people of Ireland."

Proposed Dáil participation
The SDLP, along with Sinn Féin, have long sought speaking rights in Dáil Éireann, the lower house of the Republic's parliament. In 2005, Taoiseach Bertie Ahern, leader of Fianna Fáil, put forward a proposal to allow MPs and MEPs from Northern Ireland to participate in debates on the region. However, the plan was met with vociferous opposition from the Republic's main opposition parties, Fine Gael and the Labour Party, and was subsequently shelved. Unionists had also strongly opposed the proposal.

Remembrance Day 2010
On Remembrance Day in 2010, party leader Margaret Ritchie became the first leader of a nationalist party to wear a poppy while attending a wreath-laying ceremony in Downpatrick, County Down. The poppy is worn on the lapel in the United Kingdom as a mark of respect and remembrance for fallen British soldiers in the period around Remembrance Day and is controversial in Northern Ireland, as it is viewed by many as a political symbol representing support for the British Army. Because of this, it has long been the preserve of the unionist/loyalist community. Her actions drew praise from unionists.

Leadership challenges and elections, 2011–2015
On 27 July 2011, it was reported that Margaret Ritchie faced a leadership challenge from deputy leader Patsy McGlone. The Phoenix reported that only one MLA, Alex Attwood was prepared to back her and that "she will be humiliated if she puts her leadership to a vote".

Alasdair McDonnell was confirmed as Ritchie's successor after the subsequent leadership election on 5 November 2011.

Colum Eastwood challenged McDonnell and replaced him as leader after the party's 2015 leadership election.

Ideology and policies 
The SDLP is a social democratic party that opposes austerity and Brexit. It is also an Irish nationalist party advocating for a shared home place for all the people on the island of Ireland.

While the party is officially anti-abortion it does not apply a party whip on the issue. The party supports LGBT rights including marriage equality, the roll out of PrEP across Northern Ireland and LGBT education in schools. The SDLP is anti-xenophobic and opposes plans to create what it deems a hostile environment for immigrants. The party also supports an Irish language act.

The SDLP believes that 3,000 social and affordable houses should be built every year. They oppose the gig economy and zero-hour contracts. The party opposes welfare reform and the cut to universal credit.

Despite opposing academic selection the party does not advocate the abolition of grammar schools. The party supports the abolition of tuition fees. It wants to make a modern language up to GCSE and the teaching of maths up to the age of 18 compulsory.

The party believes that the  Magee campus in Derry should be expanded to 10,000 student places.

The party supports a green corporate levy on businesses who contribute large amounts of greenhouse gases and a green jobs strategy. They also believe that a climate emergency should be declared and the government should be required to reach net zero emissions.

Leadership
Colum Eastwood is the sixth leader of the SDLP, taking over from Alasdair McDonnell in 2015.

Leader

Deputy leader

Elected representatives
The SDLP currently have two MPs in the UK Parliament, eight MLAs in the Northern Ireland Assembly and 56 councillors across Northern Ireland's 11 councils.

MPs

MLAs

Other Spokespeople

Electoral performance
Upon its formation, the SDLP quickly established itself as the second largest party and the largest nationalist party in Northern Ireland. It largely held this position until the beginning of the 21st century. In the 1998 Assembly election, it became the biggest party overall in terms of votes received and the first nationalist party to do so. This would be the largest seat share it would ever hold as it slowly saw declining support following the retirement of John Hume in 2001.

Under leader Mark Durkan, the 2001 general election and the 2003 Assembly election saw fellow Irish nationalist party Sinn Féin win more seats and votes than the SDLP for the first time, a position they would continue to hold. In the 2004 European elections, Hume stood down and the SDLP failed to retain the seat he had held since 1979, losing it to Sinn Féin. Alban Maginness attempted to take the seat again in the 2009 European elections the party fielded  as their candidate and failed to gain a seat with 78,489 first preference votes. The party further declined in the 2011 Assembly elections and the 2016 Assembly election, as the total number of votes received continued to drop.

The 2017 Assembly election saw the party retain its 12-seat count from the prior election, increasing its seat share due to a drop in the size of the assembly for the first time since 1998. This was followed by the 2017 general election where the SDLP lost all three seats and returned its worst ever vote share. In the 2019 European election, the final in the United Kingdom's history, party leader Colum Eastwood ran, increasing his party's vote but failing to take a seat. In the general election later that year the party recaptured Belfast South and Foyle with the highest ever vote recorded for the party in both constituencies and managed to increase its vote across Northern Ireland to its highest in almost fifteen years for a general election. The two seats held by the party currently have the largest majorities of any constituencies in Northern Ireland.

In the 2022 Assembly election, the SDLP slipped to the 5th largest party with only eight seats in the Assembly.

Some see the SDLP as first and foremost a party now representing Catholic middle-class interests, with voters concentrated in rural areas and the professional classes, rather than a vehicle for Irish nationalism. The SDLP reject this argument, pointing to their strong support in Derry and their victory in South Belfast in the 2005 election. Furthermore, in the lead up to the 2005 Westminster election, they published a document outlining their plans for a politically united Ireland. Their decline in Northern Ireland outside of two particular strongholds had led some to dub the party the "South Down and Londonderry Party".

Devolved legislature elections

Westminster elections

Local government elections

European elections

See also
Demography and politics of Northern Ireland
Labour Party in Northern Ireland

References

External links

1970 establishments in Northern Ireland
Political parties established in 1970
 
Irish republicanism
Social democratic parties
Labour parties in Northern Ireland
Centre-left parties in the United Kingdom
Pro-European political parties in the United Kingdom